Nils Göran "Pisa" Nicklasson (20 August 1942 – 27 January 2018) was a Swedish footballer.

Career 
Nicklasson played in IFK Göteborg during the 1960s and 1970s in Allsvenskan. In 1969, he became Swedish champion with the team.

Nicklasson also played for the Sweden national football team in the 1970 FIFA World Cup.

References

External links

1942 births
2018 deaths
Swedish footballers
Sweden international footballers
1970 FIFA World Cup players
IFK Göteborg players
Association football midfielders
Sportspeople from Västra Götaland County
People from Åmål Municipality